Operation Storax was a series of 47 nuclear tests conducted by the United States in 1962–1963 at the Nevada Test Site. These tests followed the Operation Fishbowl series and preceded the Operation Roller Coaster series.

British tests

Some accounts include the second British nuclear weapons test at the Nevada Test Site, shot Tendrac, as part of Storax. See British nuclear testing in the United States for more details.

Tests

References

Explosions in 1962
Explosions in 1963
Storax
1962 in military history
1963 in military history
1962 in Nevada
1963 in Nevada
1962 in the environment
1963 in the environment